Be Careful may refer to:

 Be Careful (album) by DeStorm Power
 Be Careful (film), 2011 Bollywood film
 "Be Careful" (Sparkle song) by Sparkle
 "Be Careful" (Cardi B song), by Cardi B
 "Be Careful", by Jason Derulo from Future History